Nazi Megastructures is a documentary television series appearing on the National Geographic Channel and a spinoff of the broader Megastructures television series. The series also aired as Nazi Mega Weapons on PBS, and as WWII Mega Weapons.

Episodes

Season 1

Season 2

Season 3

Season 4

Miniseries 
Season subtitle: Russia's War

Season 5 
Season subtitle: America's war

Season 6

See also 
 List of programs broadcast by National Geographic
http://www.pbs.org/nazi-mega-weapons/about/
http://www.nationalgeographic.com.au/tv/nazi-megastructures/

References

Documentary television series about aviation
Documentary television series about World War II
National Geographic (American TV channel) original programming
2010s American documentary television series
2013 American television series debuts